Kalmanovich is a surname. Notable people with the surname include:

Anna Kalmanovich (fl. 1893–1917), Russian feminist and suffragette
Dov Kalmanovich, Israeli politician
Shabtai Kalmanovich (1947–2009), Russian KGB spy and businessman
Zelig Kalmanovich (1885–1944), Lithuanian philologist, translator and historian

See also
Anastasia von Kalmanovich (born 1972), Russian actress and music producer